This article is for major events and other topics related to classical music in 2023.

Events
 1 January – At the 2023 Vienna New Year's Concert by the Vienna Philharmonic Orchestra under the direction of Franz Welser-Möst, the Vienna Girls Choir (Wiener Chormädchen) performs in its first-ever appearance in the concert, the first female choir ever to participate in the event.  The Wiener Chormädchen also performed at the 30 December 2022 and 31 December 2022 concerts of the same programme.
 6 January
 The Staatsoper Unter den Linden announces the resignation of Daniel Barenboim as its Generalmusikdirektor, effective 31 January 2023.
 Glyndebourne Festival Opera announces that its originally planned 2023 Glyndebourne on Tour season will not occur, as a result of the reduced funding from Arts Council England for the 2023–2026 National Portfolio.
 9 January 
 The Royal Albert Hall announces the appointment of James Ainscough as its next chief executive director, effective in the late spring of 2023.
 The Südwestdeutsche Philharmonie Konstanz announces that Insa Pijanka is to stand down as its Intendantin, earlier than the currently scheduled time of her most recent contract extension through 2024.
 10 January – The Bournemouth Symphony Orchestra announces that Kirill Karabits is to conclude his chief conductorship of the orchestra at the close of the 2023-2024 season.
 11 January – The Phoenix Symphony Orchestra announces the appointment of Peter Kjome as its next chief executive officer, effective 1 February 2023.
 12 January – The National Symphony Orchestra announces the appointment of Jean Davidson as its next executive director, effective 1 April 2023.
 13 January
 The BBC announces the appointment of Sam Jackson as the new controller of BBC Radio 3, effective April 2023.
 The new organ of the NOSPR Concert Hall in Katowice is inaugurated with the world premiere of the Sinfonia concertante of Esa-Pekka Salonen, with Iveta Apkalna as the soloist and the NOSPR conducted by the composer.
17 January
 Arts Council England (ACE) announces the presentation to English National Opera (ENO) of a one-year grant of £11.46M for the period of April 2023–March 2024, following its previous November 2022 announcement of a total withdrawal of ACE's funding to ENO for the period 2023-2026 unless ENO relocates outside of London.
 The Louisiana Philharmonic Orchestra announces the appointment of Matthew Kraemer as its next music director, effective with the 2023-2024 season.
 The Hawai'i Symphony Orchestra announces the appointment of Dane Lam as its first-ever music director, effective with the 2023-2024 season, with an initial contract of 5 years.
 23 January – The Orchestre de chambre de Paris announces the appointment of Jörn Tews as its next general director.
 25 January
 The Jerusalem Symphony Orchestra announces the appointment of Julian Rachlin as its next music director, effective with the 2023-2024 season.
 The Opéra de Marseille announces the appointment of Michele Spotti as its next music director, effective with the 2023-2024 season.
 28 January – A news report in NRC Handelsblad states that:
 Lahav Shani is to stand down as chief conductor of the Rotterdam Philharmonic Orchestra at the close of the 2025-2026 season.
 Shani is subsequently scheduled to take up the post of chief conductor of the Munich Philharmonic Orchestra at the start of the 2026-2027 season.
 31 January – The Ernst von Siemens Music Foundation announces Sir George Benjamin as the recipient of the 2023 Ernst von Siemens Music Prize.
 1 February 
 The Hong Kong Sinfonietta announces the appointment of Christoph Poppen as its next music director, effective with the 2023-2024 season.
 The Munich Philharmonic Orchestra and the Munich City Council officially announce the appointment of Lahav Shani as its next chief conductor, with an initial contract of 5 years. 
 The Théâtre du Châtelet announces the appointment of Olivier Py as its next artistic director.
 In an interview on Finnish Radio, Sir Mark Elder states that he is to stand down as music director of  The Hallé in August 2024, at the close of the 2023-2024 season.
 3 February – The Royal Concertgebouw Orchestra announces that Ulrike Niehoff is to stand down as its artistic director at the close of the 2022-2023 season.
 6 February – The Deutsche Oper Berlin announces the appointment of Aviel Cahn as its next Intendant, effective 1 August 2026.
 7 February
 The New York Philharmonic announces the appointment of Gustavo Dudamel as its next music director, effective with the 2026-2027 season, with an initial contract of 5 seasons.
 The Los Angeles Philharmonic announces that Gustavo Dudamel is to conclude his tenure as its music director at the close of the 2025-2026 season.
 9 February – Opera Saratoga announces the appointment of Mary Birnbaum as its next general and artistic director, with immediate effect. 
 11 February – Pensacola Christian College cancels a concert appearance by The King's Singers two hours before the scheduled performance time, after objections from a group of students, parents and college staff to the presence of homosexuals in the ensemble.
 15 February – The Cincinnati May Festival announces that Robert Porco is to conclude his tenure as director of choruses after the 2023-2024 season.
 16 February – The Royal Conservatory of Music announces the appointment of Alexander Brose as its next president and chief executive officer, effective 1 September 2024.
 17 February – The Berlin Philharmonic Orchestra announces the appointment of Vineta Sarieka-Völkner as one of its first concertmasters (1.Konzertmeisterin), the first woman ever named to a first concertmaster post with the orchestra.

New works
 George Alexander Albrecht – Cello Concerto
 Anna Clyne – Weathered (clarinet concerto)
 Justin Dello Joio – Oceans Apart (Concerto for Piano and Orchestra)
 James Lee III – Visions of Cahokia
 Reinaldo Moya – Rise (for cello and orchestra)
 Elizabeth Ogonek – Moondog
 Shawn Okpebholo – Songs in Flight (texts selected by Tsitsi Ella Jaji)
 Kevin Puts – Concerto for Orchestra
 Damien Ricketson – Hectic Tulips
 Colin Riley – Hearing Places
 Esa-Pekka Salonen – Sinfonia concertante for organ and orchestra
 Joseph Tawadros – Three Stages of Hindsight (oud concerto)'
 Rick van Veldhuizen – Magyar újrakeverés

New operas
 Gelsey Bell – mɔɹnɪŋ [morning//mourning]
 David Lang – note to a friend (adapted from texts by Ryunosuke Akutagawa)
 Will Liverman, DJ King Rico, and Rajendra Ramoon Maharaj – The Factotum
 Emma O'Halloran and Mark O'Halloran:
 Trade
 Mary Motorhead
 Kate Soper – The Romance of the Rose
 Vito Žuraj and Händl Klaus – Blühen

Deaths
 2 January 
 Andrew Downes, British composer and pedagogue, 72
 Kurt Horres, German stage director and opera house administrator, 90
 8 January – Siegfried Kurz, German conductor, 92
 9 January
 Yoriaki Matsudaira, Japanese composer, 91
 Charles ('Chas') Wetherbee, American violinist and pedagogue, 56
 Magnar Mangersnes, Norwegian choral conductor and organist, 84
 10 January – José Evangelista, Spanish composer and pedagogue resident in Canada, 79
 12 January – Charles Treger, American violinist and pedagogue, 87
 17 January – Manana Doijashvili, Georgian pianist and pedagogue, 75
 18 January
 Clytus Gottwald, German choral conductor, composer, musicologist, and theologian, 97
 Victor Rasgado, Mexican composer and pianist, 63
 20 January – Michaela Paetsch, American violinist, 61
 22 January
 Zhanna Pliyeva, Russian pianist and composer, 73
 Easley Blackwood Jr., American composer, 89
 26 January – Angelina Ruzzafante, Dutch soprano, 57
 28 January – Evgeny Mogilevsky, Russian pianist, 77
 29 January
 Jean-Loup Boisseau, French organ builder, 82
 Gabriel Tacchino, French pianist, 88
 4 February – Jürgen Flimm, German opera director and administrator, 81
 14 February – Friedrich Cerha, Austrian composer, 96

Major awards

Grammy Awards
 Best Chamber Music/Small Ensemble Performance: Caroline Shaw – Evergreen; Attacca Quartet (Nonesuch)
 Best Choral Performance: Michael Gilbertson and Edie Hill – Born; The Crossing, Donald Nally, conductor (Navona Records)
 Best Classical Compendium: Kitt Wakeley – An Adoption Story
 Best Classical Instrumental Solo: Letters for the Future (works by Jennifer Higdon and Kevin Puts); Time for Three, The Philadelphia Orchestra, and Xian Zhang (Deutsche Grammophon)
 Best Contemporary Classical Composition: Kevin Puts – Contact; Time for Three, The Philadelphia Orchestra, and Xian Zhang (Deutsche Grammophon)
 Best Classical Solo Vocal Album: Voice of Nature: The Anthropocene; Renée Fleming and Yannick Nézet-Séguin (Decca Classics)
 Best Opera Recording: Terence Blanchard and Kasi Lemmons – Fire Shut Up In My Bones; Angel Blue, Will Liverman, Latonia Moore, Walter Russell III; The Metropolitan Opera Orchestra, The Metropolitan Opera Chorus; Yannick Nézet-Séguin, conductor (David Frost, producer)
 Best Engineered Album, Classical: Mason Bates: Philharmonia Fantastique – The Making of the Orchestra; Chicago Symphony Orchestra; Edwin Outwater, conductor; Shawn Murphy, Charlie Post and Gary Rydstrom, engineers; Michael Romanowski, mastering engineer (Sony)
 Best Orchestral Performance: Works by Florence Price, Valerie Coleman and Jessie Montgomery; New York Youth Symphony, Michelle Cann, piano, Michael Repper, conductor (Avie)
 Producer of the Year, Classical: Judith Sherman

References

Classical
Classical music by year
Culture-related timelines by year